Israel participated in the Eurovision Song Contest 2006 with the song "Together We Are One" written by Orly Burg, Osnat Zabag and Eddie Butler. The song was performed by Eddie Butler, who had previously represented Israel in the Eurovision Song Contest in 1999 as part of the band Eden where they placed fifth with the song "Yom Huledet". The Israeli entry for the 2006 contest in Athens, Greece was selected through the national final Kdam Eurovision 2006, organised by the Israeli broadcaster Israel Broadcasting Authority (IBA). The competition took place on 15 March 2006 and featured eleven entries. "Ze Hazman" performed by Eddie Butler emerged as the winner after achieving the highest score following the combination of votes from four regional juries, an audience vote and a public vote. The song title was later translated from Hebrew to English for the Eurovision Song Contest and was titled "Together We Are One".

As one of the ten highest placed finishers in the 2005 contest, Israel automatically qualified to compete in the final of the Eurovision Song Contest. Performing in position 3, Israel placed twenty-third out of the 24 participating countries with 4 points.

Background 

Prior to the 2006 Contest, Israel had participated in the Eurovision Song Contest twenty-eight times since its first entry in 1973. Israel has won the contest on three occasions: in 1978 with the song "A-Ba-Ni-Bi" performed by Izhar Cohen and the Alphabeta, in 1979 with the song "Hallelujah" performed by Milk and Honey and in 1998 with the song "Diva" performed by Dana International. Since the introduction of semi-finals to the format of the Eurovision Song Contest in 2004, Israel has, to this point, managed to qualify to the final one time, including a top ten result in 2005 with Shiri Maimon and "HaSheket SheNish'ar" placing fourth.

The Israeli national broadcaster, Israel Broadcasting Authority (IBA) had been in charge of the nation's participation in the contest since its debut in 1973. IBA confirmed Israel's participation in the contest on 5 December 2005. In 2005, IBA organised that a national final with several entries in order to select the Israeli entry, a selection procedure that continued for their 2006 entry.

Before Eurovision

Kdam Eurovision 2006 
The Israeli entry for the Eurovision Song Contest 2006 was selected through the national final Kdam Eurovision 2006. The competition took place on 15 March 2006 at the Nakdi TV Studios in Jerusalem, hosted by Yael Bar Zohar and Eden Harel and was broadcast on Channel 1 as well as online via IBA's official Eurovision Song Contest website Eurovil.

Competing entries 
IBA directly invited twelve artists to participate in the competition which were announced on 15 December 2005. Among the competing artists was 1999 Israeli Eurovision entrant, Eddie Butler. Avi Greinik, Gabi Shushan, Maya Bouskilla, Rama Messinger and Uzi Fux & Cheri were later withdrawn from the competition and replaced by Avi Peretz, Svika Pick and Tzipi Mash'hid. Prior to the final, the competing songs were presented on 5 March 2006 during a special presentation programme broadcast via radio on Reshet Gimmel.

Final 
The final took place on 15 March 2006. Eleven entries competed and the winner, "Ze Hazman" performed by Eddie Butler, was selected by a combination of the votes from ten voting groups: four regional juries, the studio audience and a public vote conducted through regional televoting and SMS voting. In addition to the performances of the competing entries, the competing artists performed a medley of former Israeli Eurovision or Kdam Eurovision songs written by Ehud Manor who died in 2005, while 2005 Israeli Eurovision entrant Shiri Maimon performed her newest song "Le'an Shelo Telhi" as the interval act.

At Eurovision
According to Eurovision rules, all nations with the exceptions of the host country, the "Big Four" (France, Germany, Spain and the United Kingdom) and the ten highest placed finishers in the 2005 contest are required to qualify from the semi-final in order to compete for the final; the top ten countries from each semi-final progress to the final. Following a fourth place in the 2005 contest, Israel automatically qualified to compete in the final on 20 May 2006. On 21 March 2006, a special allocation draw was held which determined the running order for the semi-final and the grand final. During the allocation draw, it was determined that Israel would perform in position 3 in the final, following the entry from Moldova and before the entry from Latvia. Israel placed twenty-third in the final, scoring 4 points.

Voting 
Below is a breakdown of points awarded to Israel and awarded by Israel in the semi-final and grand final of the contest. The nation awarded its 12 points to Russia in the semi-final and the final of the contest.

Points awarded to Israel

Points awarded by Israel

References

2006
Countries in the Eurovision Song Contest 2006
Eurovision